Shen Shanjiong (13 April 1917 – 26 March 2021) was a Chinese microbiologist and geneticist. He was an academician of the Chinese Academy of Sciences.

Biography
Shen was born into a family of farming background in Wujiang County, Jiangsu, on 13 April 1917. He attended Tailaiqiao School and Tongli School. After graduating from Wujiang Middle School, he was accepted to Suzhou Agricultural School. In 1937, he was admitted to the University of Nanking. In the summer of the same year, he studied at the Agricultural College of Guangxi University due to the Second Sino-Japanese War. In 1939, he transferred to the National Southwestern Associated University, where he studied fungus under Dai Fanglan.

In 1944, he became an instructor at Huazhong University. The next year, he worked as an assistant researcher at the Institute of Botany, Academia Sinica, in Beibei, Sichuan (now Beibei District of Chongqing), under the introduction of Zhang Jingyue. In 1946, he was appointed an assistant of the Department of Botany, Peking University.

In 1947, he pursued advanced studies in the United States, first earning a doctor's degree in molecular genetics from California Institute of Technology in 1950 and then carried out postdoctoral research at the University of Wisconsin. He returned to China after the outbreak of the Korean War. In November 1950, he became an associate professor at the School of Medicine, Zhejiang University. In 1952, he was transferred to the Chinese Academy of Sciences as an associate research fellow and was promoted to research fellow in 1956. Since 1980, he was a visiting professor at California Institute of Technology, New York University Grossman School of Medicine, Harvard Medical School, and Boston Biomedical Research Institute. In 1984, he was hired as an honorary professor of Shanghai Jiao Tong University, helping to set up the Department of Biological Science and Technology.

On 26 March 2021, he died of illness in Shanghai, aged 103.

Contributions
Shen developed aureomycin in 1957, making China the fourth country in the world to produce aureomycin.

Honours and awards
 1956 State Natural Science Award (First Class)
 1979 State Natural Science Award (First Class)
 1981 State Natural Science Award (First Class)
 1997 Tan Kah Kee Award for Life Sciences
 1999 Science and Technology Progress Award of the Ho Leung Ho Lee Foundation
 1980 Member of the Chinese Academy of Sciences (CAS)

References

1917 births
2021 deaths
Scientists from Jiangsu
National Southwestern Associated University alumni
California Institute of Technology alumni
Academic staff of Peking University
Academic staff of Zhejiang University
Academic staff of Shanghai Jiao Tong University
Members of the Chinese Academy of Sciences
Chinese centenarians
Men centenarians